KRSA (580 AM) was a broadcast radio station licensed to Petersburg, Alaska, serving Southeast Alaska. KRSA was last owned and operated by Sea-Christ Broadcasting Corporation.

History

KRSA's original construction permit was issued on July 24, 1981 and the station went on the air for the first time on September 24, 1982, under the ownership of Northern Light Network.  Northern Light Network was and still is a subsidiary of the interdenominational Christian mission agency, SEND International, which is based out of Farmington, Michigan.

On December 14, 2010, Northern Light Network sold KRSA and the three association translator stations to Petersburg-based Sea-Christ Broadcasting Corporation for $1.00.  The deal was closed on February 3, 2011, with the new owner, Sea-Christ Broadcasting Corporation, taking full ownership of the station and translators.

KRSA debuted a new live-and-local morning news and talk program called "The Narrow Way" shortly after the sale was closed.

Closure
KRSA and its translators fell silent on December 31, 2012.  Board of Director President Ed May said, at the time, the station was "in the process of redirecting its ministry" and that the "non-profit couldn't afford to keep broadcasting".

On December 11, 2013, KRSA resumed operations according to documents filed with the Federal Communications Commission (FCC).  More than a month later, on January 30, 2014, the FCC announced that Sea-Christ Broadcasting Corporation had failed to file a license renewal application for KRSA or any of its translators.  The licenses for KRSA and its translators all expired and were cancelled on February 1, 2014.

Programming
KRSA carried programming featuring religious teaching from various sources including James Dobson's Focus on the Family, Moody Radio, VCY America and Salem Radio Network.  The station also aired secular programming including the morning news program Bill Bennett's "Morning in America" and top-of-the-hour news from United News and Information.  Sports programming from the Seattle Mariners Radio Network and the Seattle Seahawks Radio Network were also heard on KRSA.

Translators
KRSA previously broadcast its main frequency not only at 580 AM, but also on three translator stations.  Those stations all previously broadcast at 94.9 FM.

References

External links
 

1982 establishments in Alaska
Radio stations established in 1982
Defunct religious radio stations in the United States
Radio stations disestablished in 2014
Defunct radio stations in the United States
2014 disestablishments in Alaska
RSA
RSA